Robert Allan Connors (October 19, 1902 — July 27, 1931) was a Scottish-born Canadian professional ice hockey left winger and defenceman who played 78 games in the National Hockey League between 1926 and 1930. He played with the Detroit Cougars and New York Americans. He was born in Edinburgh, Scotland, United Kingdom and raised in Port Arthur, Ontario.

Connors died in the summer of 1931 due to a broken neck, caused by diving into shallow waters near Port Arthur, Ontario.

Career statistics

Regular season and playoffs

External links

1902 births
1931 deaths
Canadian expatriate ice hockey players in the United States
Canadian ice hockey left wingers
Detroit Cougars players
Detroit Olympics (CPHL) players
Detroit Olympics (IHL) players
Ice hockey people from Ontario
New York Americans players
Niagara Falls Cataracts players
Ontario Hockey Association Senior A League (1890–1979) players
Scottish emigrants to Canada
Seattle Eskimos players
Sportspeople from Edinburgh
Sportspeople from Thunder Bay